Telescopes have grown in size since they first appeared around 1608. The following tables list the increase in size over the years. Different technologies can and have been used to build telescopes, which are used to magnify distant views especially in astronomy.

By overall aperture 
The following is a list of largest single mount optical telescopes sorted by total objective diameter (aperture), including segmented and multi-mirror configurations. It is a historical list, with the instruments listed in chronological succession by objective size. By itself, the diameter of the primary optics can be a poor measure of a telescope's historical or scientific significance; for example, William Parsons, 3rd Earl of Rosse's 72-inch (1.8 m) reflecting telescope did not perform as well (i.e. gather as much light) as the smaller silvered glass mirror telescopes that succeeded it because of the poor performance of its speculum metal mirror.

By historical significance 
Chronological list of optical telescopes by historical significance, which reflects the overall technological progression and not only the primary mirror's diameter (as shown in table above).

See also

References

External links
 Largest optical telescopes of the world
 List of large reflecting telescopes
 The World's Largest Optical Telescopes
 Selected largest telescopes
 The Historical Growth of Telescope Aperture (2003)

Lists of telescopes
Optical telescopes

it:Cronologia dei telescopi più grandi del mondo